Sister Superior is a 6,037 ft elevation sandstone summit located southeast of The Convent in Grand County of Utah, United States. Sister Superior is located between Professor Valley and Castle Valley, near the city of Moab. It is situated east of Parriott Mesa and southwest of the Fisher Towers area. Remnants of an eroded butte, Sister Superior is a thin tower with 300+ ft vertical Wingate Sandstone walls standing on a 1,000 foot Moenkopi-Chinle base. The nearest higher peak is The Rectory (6,565 ft),  to the south. Further south along the connecting ridge is Castleton Tower. Precipitation runoff from Sister Superior drains into the nearby Colorado River. The first ascent was made May 17, 1965, by Harvey Carter and David Bentley.

Climbing Routes

Climbing Routes at Sister Superior

 Jah Man  -  - 5 pitches
 Black Sabbath -  - 4 pitches
 Absolution -  - 3 pitches
 The GAG Route -  - 4 pitches

Climate

Spring and fall are the most favorable seasons to visit, when highs average 60 to 80 °F and lows average 30 to 50 F. Summer temperatures often exceed 100 °F. Winters are cold, with highs averaging 30 to 50 °F, and lows averaging 0 to 20 °F. As part of a high desert region, it can experience wide daily temperature fluctuations. The area receives an average of less than 10 inches (25 cm) of rain annually.

Gallery

References

External links

 YouTube Jah Man climbing route, Sister Superior Tower

Rock formations of Utah
Climbing areas of Utah
Sandstone formations of the United States
Landforms of Grand County, Utah